The 1130s was a decade of the Julian Calendar which began on January 1, 1130, and ended on December 31, 1139.

Significant people
 Al-Mustarshid
 Pope Innocent II
 Al-Rashid Billah
 Al-Muqtafi

References

Sources